Rishir Prem (English translation: Love of a Sage)  is a 1931 Bengali film directed by Jyotish Bandyopadhyay, produced by Madan Theatre Limited. It was released on 3 October 1931 at Crown Cinema Hall in Calcutta.

Cast
 Ganesh Chandra Goswami as rishi
 Hiren Bose
 Kanan Devi as utpala 
 Charubala
 Sarajubala
 Ahindra Choudhary
 Joy Narayan Mukherjee

References

External links

1931 films
1931 drama films
Bengali-language Indian films
Indian black-and-white films
1930s Bengali-language films
Indian drama films